North of the Rockies is a 1942 American Western film directed by Lambert Hillyer and starring Bill Elliott and Tex Ritter.

Plot
Western. Mounty rounds up gang of fur smugglers

Cast
 Bill Elliott as Sergeant Wild Bill Cameron
 Tex Ritter as Tex Martin
 Frank Mitchell as Cannonball Rideaux
 Shirley Patterson as Lydia Rogers
 Larry Parks as Jim Bailey
 John Miljan as Lionel Morgan
 Ian MacDonald as Lazare
 Lloyd Bridges as Constable McDowell
 Gertrude Hoffman as Flora Bailey
 Earl Gunn as John Callan
 Boyd Irwin as Mountie Captain Adams
 Tex Palmer as Fur Trapper

See also
 List of American films of 1942

References

External links

1942 films
American Western (genre) films
1942 Western (genre) films
American black-and-white films
Films directed by Lambert Hillyer
1940s English-language films
1940s American films